The Husaynids are a branch of the Alids who are descendants of Husayn ibn Ali, a grandson of the Islamic prophet Muhammad.

Genealogical trees

Family tree of Husayn ibn Ali

Dynasties 

 the various lines of Shi'a imams are largely Husaynid, being descended patrilineally from Husayn ibn Ali, the third imam. This applies to the Twelver Shi'a imams, the Zaydiyya, and the various lines of Isma'ili imams. 
 the Isma'ili Fatimid dynasty and the later Aga Khans.
 a Zaydi dynasty, descended from Hasan al-Utrush, that intermittently ruled Tabaristan in the early 10th century
 the position of Sharif of Medina was usually in the hands of Husaynid dynasties
 Al Qasimi of Sharjah and Ras Al Khaimah, United Arab Emirates
 Jamalullail of Perlis, Malaysia
 Bendahara of Pahang and Terengganu, Malaysia
 Temenggong of Johor, Malaysia
 Isaaq of Somaliland

See also 
 al-Husayni family, a prominent Palestinian clan formerly based in Jerusalem, which claims descent from Husayn ibn Ali

References